The Co-Cathedral of St. Joseph the Worker is a cathedral of the Roman Catholic Church in American Samoa, a Territory of the United States. It is the mother church and co-seat of the bishop of the Diocese of Samoa–Pago Pago along with the Cathedral of the Holy Family in Tafuna. The church is located in the village of Fagatogo.  It was completed in 1959 and was the only cathedral in the diocese until 1995 when Holy Family was consecrated.

See also
List of Catholic cathedrals in the United States
List of cathedrals in the United States

References

Joseph the Worker, Fagotogo, American Samoa, Co-Cathedral of
Roman Catholic churches completed in 1959
20th-century Roman Catholic church buildings in the United States